Hans-Helmuth Krause (18 July 1907 – 26 February 1944) was a German middle-distance runner. He competed in the men's 1500 metres at the 1928 Summer Olympics. He was killed in action during World War II.

References

External links
 

1905 births
1944 deaths
Athletes (track and field) at the 1928 Summer Olympics
German male middle-distance runners
Olympic athletes of Germany
Place of birth missing
German military personnel killed in World War II